In the mathematical theory of knots, the unknot, not knot, or trivial knot, is the least knotted of all knots.  Intuitively, the unknot is a closed loop of rope without a knot tied into it, unknotted.  To a knot theorist, an unknot is any embedded topological circle in the 3-sphere that is ambient isotopic (that is, deformable) to a geometrically round circle, the standard unknot.

The unknot is the only knot that is the boundary of an embedded disk, which gives the characterization that only unknots have Seifert genus 0.  Similarly, the unknot is the identity element with respect to the knot sum operation.

Unknotting problem 

Deciding if a particular knot is the unknot was a major driving force behind knot invariants, since it was thought this approach would possibly give an efficient algorithm to recognize the unknot from some presentation such as a knot diagram. Unknot recognition is known to be in both NP and co-NP.

It is known that knot Floer homology and Khovanov homology detect the unknot, but these are not known to be efficiently computable for this purpose.  It is not known whether the Jones polynomial or finite type invariants can detect the unknot.

Examples 
It can be difficult to find a way to untangle string even though the fact it started out untangled proves the task is possible.  Thistlethwaite and Ochiai provided many examples of diagrams of unknots that have no obvious way to simplify them, requiring one to temporarily increase the diagram's crossing number.

While rope is generally not in the form of a closed loop, sometimes there is a canonical way to imagine the ends being joined together.  From this point of view, many useful practical knots are actually the unknot, including those that can be tied in a bight.

Every tame knot can be represented as a linkage, which is a collection of rigid line segments connected by universal joints at their endpoints.  The stick number is the minimal number of segments needed to represent a knot as a linkage, and a stuck unknot is a particular unknotted linkage that cannot be reconfigured into a flat convex polygon.  Like crossing number, a linkage might need to be made more complex by subdividing its segments before it can be simplified.

Invariants
The Alexander–Conway polynomial and Jones polynomial of the unknot are trivial:

No other knot with 10 or fewer crossings has trivial Alexander polynomial, but the Kinoshita–Terasaka knot and Conway knot (both of which have 11 crossings) have the same Alexander and Conway polynomials as the unknot. It is an open problem whether any non-trivial knot has the same Jones polynomial as the unknot.

The unknot is the only knot whose knot group is an infinite cyclic group, and its knot complement is homeomorphic to a solid torus.

See also

References

External links